Here is a list of hospitals in Sweden.

 Blekinge County
Blekingesjukhuset - Karlshamn
Blekinge Hospital - Karlskrona
Dalarna County
Avesta vårdcentral Lasarettet - Avesta
Borlänge sjukhus - Borlänge
Falun lasarett - Falun
Ludvika lasarett - Ludvika
Mora lasarett - Mora
Gävleborg County
Bollnäs sjukhus - Bollnäs
Gävle Hospital - Gävle
Sjukhuset i Hudiksvall - Hudiksvall
Gotland County
Visby lasarett - Visby
Halland County
Halmstad Hospital - Halmstad
Varberg Hospital - Varberg
Jämtland County
Region Jämtland Härjedalen - Östersund
Kalmar County
Landstingsfastigheter - Kalmar
Kronoberg County
Centrallasarettet i Växjö
 Ljungby Hospital - Ljungby
Norrbotten County
Kalix Hospital - Kalix
Sunderby Hospital - Boden and Luleå
Gällivare Hospital - Gällivare
Piteå Rivervalley Hospital - Piteå
Kiruna Hospital - Kiruna
Östergötland County
Finspångs Lasarett - Finspång
Linköping University Hospital - Linköping
Vrinnevisjukhuset - Norrköping
Skåne County
Helsingborg Hospital - Helsingborg
Ängelholm Hospital - Ängelholm
Hässleholms Sjukhus - Hässleholm
Landskrona Hospital - Landskrona
Skåne University Hospital - Malmö and Lund
Trelleborg Hospital - Trelleborg
Ystad Hospital - Ystad
Kristianstads Lasarett - Kristianstad
Södermanland County
Mälarsjukhuset Eskilstuna - Eskilstuna
Kullbergska sjukhuset - Katrineholm
Nyköpings lasarett - Nyköping
Stockholm County
Beckomberga Hospital - Bromma - psychiatric hospital (1932-1995)
Bromma sjukhus - Bromma
Dalens sjukhus - Enskededalen
Danderyds sjukhus - Danderyd
Ersta Hospital - Stockholm
Huddinge universitetssjukhus - Huddinge (now a part of Karolinska universitetssjukhuset and called Karolinska Universitetsjukhuset i Huddinge)
Jakobsbergs sjukhus - Järfälla
New Karolinska Solna University Hospital - Solna and Huddinge
Löwenströmska sjukhuset - Upplands Väsby
Norrtälje sjukhus - Norrtälje
Nynäshamns sjukhus - Nynäshamn
S:t Eriks ögonsjukhus - Stockholm Municipality
Saint Göran Hospital - Stockholm Municipality
Sabbatsbergs sjukhus - Stockholm Municipality
Sollentuna sjukhus - Sollentuna Municipality
Södersjukhuset - Stockholm Municipality
Södertälje sjukhus - Södertälje
Sophiahemmet Sjukhus - Stockholm
Stockholm Heart Center
Regionala Cancercentrum i Samverkan - Stockholm
Uppsala County
Lasarettet i Enköping  - Enköping
Uppsala University Hospital ( - Uppsala)
Västerbotten County
Norrland University Hospital - Umeå
Västra Götaland County
Alingsås lasarett - Alingsås
Södra Älvsborgs Sjukhus - Borås
Skaraborgs Sjukhus Falköping - Falköping
Mölndals Sjukhus - Mölndal
Norra Älvsborgs Länssjukhus - Trollhättan
Frölunda Specialist Hospital - Västra Frölunda, Gothenburg
Sahlgrenska University Hospital - Gothenburg
Sahlgrenska University Hospital East - Gothenburg
Skaraborgs Sjukhus Lidköping - Lidköping
Skaraborgs sjukhus Skövde - Skövde
Uddevalla Hospital
Kungälvs sjukhus - Kungälv
Jönköping County
Länssjukhuset Ryhov - Jönköping
Värnamo Sjukhus - Värnamo
Höglandssjukhuset - Eksjö
Örebro County
Karlskoga lasarett - Karlskoga
Örebro University Hospital - Örebro 
Lindesbergs lasarett - Lindesberg
Västmanland County
Köping Hospital - Köping
Västerås Central Hospital - Västerås
Värmland County
Sjukhuset i Arvika - Arvika
Centralsjukhuset Karlstad - Karlstad
Torsby lasarett - Torsby
Västernorrland County 
Länssjukhuset Sundsvall-Härnösand - Härnösand

References

Sweden

Hospitals
Sweden